At-Tur (lit. "The Mount" in Arabic) is an Arab-majority neighborhood on the Mount of Olives approximately 1 km east of the Old City of Jerusalem. At-Tur is situated in East Jerusalem, occupied and later effectively annexed by Israel after the Six-Day War in 1967.

History
The Chapel of the Ascension is located in At-Tur. Located on the Mount of Olives, the chapel is part of a larger complex consisting first of a Christian church and monastery, then an Islamic mosque. It is located on a site which the Christian faithful traditionally believe to be the earthly spot where Jesus ascended into Heaven forty days after his resurrection.

Ottoman era
In 1596, the village appeared as Tur Zayta in Ottoman tax registers as being in the Nahiya of Quds of the Liwa of Quds. It had a population of 48 households and 8 bachelors, all Muslim, and paid taxes on wheat, barley, vines or fruit trees, and goats or beehives, a total of 3,200 akçe.

In 1838, in the Biblical Researches in Palestine, it was noted as a Muslim village, located in el-Wadiyeh’ district, east of Jerusalem.Robinson and Smith, 1841, vol. 2, pp. 347,  405,  565

An Ottoman village list of about 1870 counted 38 houses and a population of 127, though the population count included only men. It was described as a village on the Mount of Olives.Hartmann, 1883, p.  124 also noted 38 houses

In 1883, the Palestine Exploration Fund's Survey of Western Palestine (SWP)  described At-Tur as "a small straggling village on the top of Olivet. The houses are built of stone, but low and mean. The church of the Ascension, now a mosque, stands towards the west at the brow of the hill."

In 1896 the population of Et-tur'' was estimated to be about 474 persons.

British Mandate era
In the 1922 census of Palestine conducted by the British Mandate authorities, At Tur had a population 1,037; 806 Muslims and 231 Christians, increasing in the 1931 census to 2,090; 12 Jews, 253 Christians and 1,825 Muslims, in 400 houses.

In the 1945 statistics the population of Et Tur was 2,770; 2,380 Muslims and 390 Christians, who owned 8,808  dunams of land  according to an official land and population survey. 228  dunams were plantations and irrigable land, 2,838 for cereals, while 86 dunams were built-up (urban) land.

Jordanian era
After the 1948 Arab-Israeli War, At-Tur came under Jordanian rule.

The Jordanian census of 1961 found 4,289 inhabitants in At-Tur, of whom 686 were Christian.

Post-1967
During the 1967 Six-Day War, At-Tur came under Israeli occupation, remaining so after the war.

At-Tur has a population of 18,150, mostly Israeli Jews, as well as Muslims and a small Christian minority. Landmarks in At-Tur include the Augusta Victoria Hospital, the Church and Convent of Pater Noster, where the Lord's Prayer is inscribed in 110 languages, and the Seven Arches Hotel.

The Al-Makassed Islamic Charitable Hospital, a 250-bed medical facility with in-patient and out-patient services is located in At-Tur.

Jewish Israelis have been buying properties in the neighbourhood and have been resettling the Mount of Olives at a growing rate.

On Friday, 24 April 2015, a 16-year-old resident of at-Tur was shot dead by Israeli soldiers at the Az-Zaim checkpoint. The police said he attacked with a knife, but his family denied this.

See also

Status of Jerusalem

References

Bibliography

External links
Survey of Western Palestine, Map 17:    IAA, Wikimedia commons
 Silwan & Ath Thuri (Fact Sheet),   Applied Research Institute–Jerusalem (ARIJ)
Ath Thuri and Silwan aerial photo,  ARIJ
 Locality Development Priorities and Needs in Silwan & Ath Thuri,  ARIJ

Neighbourhoods of Jerusalem
Jerusalem Governorate
Arab neighborhoods in Jerusalem
Mount of Olives